Strange Brew (also known as The Adventures of Bob & Doug McKenzie: Strange Brew) is a 1983 Canadian comedy film starring the popular SCTV characters Bob and Doug McKenzie, portrayed by Dave Thomas and Rick Moranis, who also served as co-directors. Co-stars include Max von Sydow, Paul Dooley, Lynne Griffin and Angus MacInnes.

Loosely based on elements of Shakespeare's Hamlet, most of the film was shot in Toronto, Scarborough, Kitchener and Hamilton, Ontario. Parts were also filmed in Prince George, British Columbia.

Plot
Two unemployed brothers, Bob and Doug McKenzie (Rick Moranis and Dave Thomas), screen a poorly-made film they have produced to a theater audience. When the disappointed patrons become hostile, they release a jar of moths into the theater, which disrupts the showing and allows them to escape without issuing refunds, although they did give one refund to a couple of crying kids, which turned out to be the beer money their father gave them. The next day, the two place a live mouse in an empty beer bottle in an attempt to blackmail the local beer store into giving them free Elsinore beer, but they are told to take their complaint to Elsinore brewery's management; when they do so, they are given jobs on the bottling line inspecting for mice in bottles.

Meanwhile, the evil Brewmeister Smith (Max von Sydow) is developing a plan to take over the world by adulterating Elsinore beer with a mind control drug which, while rendering the consumer docile, also makes them vulnerable to mind control when certain tones are played. Smith tests this spiked beer on patients of the neighbouring Royal Canadian Institute for the Mentally Insane, which is connected to the brewery by tunnels.

Bob and Doug learn that the brewery's former owner, John Elsinore, has recently died under mysterious circumstances and his daughter Pam (Lynne Griffin) has been given full control of the Elsinore brewery. While exploring the massive complex, they find a shuttered cafeteria containing an old Galactic Border Patrol video game, which supernaturally reveals that Brewmeister Smith murdered John Elsinore and that Pam's bumbling Uncle Claude (Paul Dooley) was involved. Bob recognizes a brewery employee as former hockey great Jean "Rosie" LeRose (Angus MacInnes), who suffered a career-ending nervous breakdown and has fallen under Smith's control.

Eventually, Bob and Doug wander into the Brewmeister's operations room while he is away, and Doug takes a floppy disk containing a video of John Elsinore's murder (thinking it is a "new wave EP bootleg" and not realizing the importance of its contents). Smith and Claude tranquilize the brothers and arrange to frame them for murder, concealing Pam and her father's friend, Henry Green (Douglas Campbell), in beer kegs in the back of their sabotaged van, and instruct the brothers to deliver the kegs to a party. Unable to stop, the brothers careen into Lake Ontario. All survive (Pam with apparent memory loss), and the brothers are arrested.

The brothers' bizarre antics at their trial cause the judge to declare them insane and put them under Brewmeister Smith's care at the asylum. Rosie soon finds them and helps them escape, and they find and rescue Pam. Having figured out the Brewmeister's plan, Rosie foments an uprising among the brainwashed mental-patient test subjects. The brothers separate for the first time in their lives. Doug and a group of asylum inmates help capture Claude, while Rosie and another group overpower Brewmeister Smith. The spirit of John Elsinore, possessing the brewery's electrical system, electrocutes Smith when he is shoved against his light-up world map. Meanwhile, Smith has locked Pam and Bob in a brewery tank and begins filling it with beer; they escape when Bob consumes all the beer, expanding to a cartoonish size.

John Elsinore's ghost warns them that Smith has already shipped tainted beer to Oktoberfest and urges them to prevent the beer from being consumed. The police accompany the brothers back to their house to retrieve their dog, Hosehead, to invade the party. Enticed by promises of free beer and sausages, Hosehead leaps into the air and flies over the city like Superman. He crashes into the tent at the celebration and, mistaken for a skunk, frightens people away from the tainted beer. In the end, the McKenzie Brothers are heroes and Pam and Rosie find true love. Bob and Doug are allowed to haul away the contaminated beer, apparently to try to drink it all. The movie ends with an over-the-credits commentary by Bob and Doug about the movie and select crew members as their names scroll by in the credits.

Cast
 Dave Thomas as Doug McKenzie
 Rick Moranis as Bob McKenzie
 Max von Sydow as Brewmeister Smith
 Lynne Griffin as Pam Elsinore
 Angus MacInnes as Jean "Rosie" LeRose
 Paul Dooley as Uncle Claude
 Brian McConnachie as Ted
 Mel Blanc as voice of Father McKenzie
 Tom Harvey as The Inspector
 Douglas Campbell as Henry Green
 Len Doncheff as Jack Hawkland
 Buddy the Dog as Hosehead
 Chris Benson as Hospital Orderly

Production
In 1981, Rick Moranis and Dave Thomas recorded a Bob and Doug McKenzie comedy album, The Great White North, which sold a million copies. Based on this success, they thought about parlaying that success into a feature film. After fellow SCTV cast member John Candy got an offer from Universal Pictures to do a film called Going Berserk, Moranis and Thomas started talking about writing a screenplay for a Bob and Doug film. Andrew Alexander, executive producer for SCTV, reminded them that he had exclusive contracts with the two men and that if they wrote a script, he would sue them. Moranis and Thomas soon found themselves faced with the challenge of expanding their improvisations on SCTV from "two guys talking about how hard it was to get parking spaces in donut shops to a full-length story", Thomas said in an interview.

Moranis and Thomas hired Steve De Jarnatt to write the first draft. Initially, Thomas told De Jarnatt that he wanted to base the film's story on Hamlet, but De Jarnatt's draft was too faithful to the play and he was told be more creative with the parallels. Moranis' and Thomas' agents sent the script to various Hollywood studios, and a few days later they had a deal with Metro-Goldwyn-Mayer based not on the script but on record sales, "the breakout potential, and the fact that it was being advertised on a television show", Thomas remembers. MGM was unhappy with the script because Bob and Doug were improvised characters done in their "comic voices" and they felt that nobody but themselves could write for these characters. Thomas began rewriting the script without Moranis, who was now uncertain about doing the film. After working on the first 50 pages, Moranis took a look at what Thomas had done and they then worked together rewriting it. However, they were not sure just how much they could legally change and did most of the changes in the first third of the script, including the addition of Bob and Doug's science fiction film, Mutants of 2051 A.D., which Bob and Doug were shown watching in a movie theater, causing a riot. Thomas remembers that the script was "far more bizarre and conceptual in the beginning ... if we had been able to rewrite the whole thing, we would have made the whole thing like that".

Originally, Moranis and Thomas were not going to direct or write the film but ended up doing both with the guidance of executive producer Jack Grossberg, who had produced films by Mel Brooks and Woody Allen. They were given a budget of $5 million. Before filming, all of the major breweries wanted the McKenzie brothers to appear in beer advertisements. The filmmakers had the promise of the Molson Brewery, but once the brewery found out that there was a joke in the film about putting a mouse in a beer bottle, they distanced themselves from the film. The filmmakers were also banned from filming in a Brewers Retail store, and from using the name "Brewers Retail". The filmmakers instead built a replica of a Brewers Retail store at a cost of more than $45,000, calling it "The Beer Store". Filming also took place at the Old Fort Brewing Co. in Prince George, British Columbia. The emergency vehicles used during filming were all real Metropolitan Toronto Police squad cars. The ambulances used briefly were on loan from Metropolitan Toronto Ambulance.

Reception
On Rotten Tomatoes, Strange Brew has an approval rating of 76% based on reviews from 25 critics with an average rating of 6.70/10. The site's critical consensus reads, "Though lowbrow in intent and outcome, Strange Brew effectively mines laughs from its unique premise and likeable stars." On Metacritic, the film received a score of 50 based on six reviews, indicating "mixed or average reviews".
In her review for The New York Times, Janet Maslin wrote, "Anyone who's partial to the McKenzies' humor doubtless has a fondness for beer. The price of a ticket could buy enough beer for an experience at least as memorable as this one." Gary Arnold, in his review for The Washington Post, wrote, "Neither triumph nor fiasco, Strange Brew leaves plenty of room for improvement, but I hope Thomas and Moranis get the chance to demonstrate that they've learned a lot from the mixed assortment of nuttiness in their first movie comedy." In his review for The Globe and Mail, Jay Scott wrote, "What's terrific about the McKenzie Brothers is their offhand depiction of two English-Canadian working-class dimwits ... and what's terrific about the movie is its equally offhand surrealism."

Soundtrack album

The soundtrack album was released in August 1983 by PolyGram and Anthem Records of Canada (ANR 1-1042). (Full title: The Adventures of Bob and Doug McKenzie: Strange Brew - Excerpts from the Original Soundtrack). Most of the album consisted of comedy sketches and film dialogue, while the music sampling was usually accompanied by the characters' commentary. The main title theme was performed by Thomas' brother, Ian Thomas. The album was produced by Marc Giacomelli, Rick Shurman and Ian Thomas. 
The soundtrack won the Canadian Juno Award for Best Comedy Album in 1984. Moranis and Thomas accepted the award in character at the awards ceremony on 5 December 1984, which was hosted by Joe Flaherty and SCTV alum Andrea Martin.
The album was only available for a short time and currently remains out of print. This was the last album released by the duo.

Motion picture score
As with the soundtrack album, the motion picture score was released for a short time and remains out of print. The album runs approximately 63 minutes and was composed and conducted by Charles Fox.

Book
To promote the film, a beer-shaped paperback book was released in 1983, The Adventures of Bob & Doug McKenzie in Strange Brew: The Book About the Movie About the TV Show About the Men!. The book featured pictures of the characters, stills from Strange Brew, comics, puzzles and much of the characters' humor. The book also included a joke library card with the names of numerous Canadian celebrities who had checked it out. The book was only available for a brief period and is currently out of print.

Sequel
A sequel to the film, entitled Home Brew, was planned for production in 1999, but financing fell through at the last minute. Co-written by Dave Thomas and Paul Flaherty, the film was to be directed by Flaherty, and Dan Aykroyd was on board to play the part of friend Rick Ripple. Principal photography was to begin on July 19, 1999 in Toronto. At one point, Todd McFarlane was to step in as executive producer to revive financing for the film, but never followed through.

The plot, according to a Maple Palm (Dave Thomas's production company) release, would feature Bob and Doug, now working as garbage men, being convinced by a fast-talking insurance salesman (Aykroyd) to get into the microbrewing business.

See also

List of films featuring fictional films

References

External links

 

Bob and Doug McKenzie website, pictures, clips, and information

1983 films
1980s buddy comedy films
Bob and Doug McKenzie
Canadian comedy films
English-language Canadian films
Films set in Toronto
Films shot in Hamilton, Ontario
Films shot in Toronto
Metro-Goldwyn-Mayer films
Films about beer
Films based on Hamlet
Modern adaptations of works by William Shakespeare
Self-reflexive films
Films scored by Charles Fox
1983 directorial debut films
1983 comedy films
1980s English-language films
Films directed by Dave Thomas
1980s Canadian films